El Caminito del Rey (The King's Little Path) is a walkway pinned along the steep walls of a narrow gorge in El Chorro, near Ardales in the province of Málaga, Spain. Its name derives from the original name of Camino del Rey (King's Pathway), abbreviated  locally to el caminito. The walkway was constructed in the early 20th century, but by the early 21st century, it had fallen into disrepair and was partially closed for over a decade.  After four years of extensive repairs and renovations, it re-opened in 2015. It has been described as the "world's most dangerous walkway" following five deaths in 1999 and 2000.

History
The walkway was built to provide workers at the hydroelectric power plants at Chorro Falls and Gaitanejo Falls with a means to cross between them, to provide for transport of materials, and to help facilitate inspection and maintenance of the channel. The construction began in 1901 and was finished in 1905. King Alfonso XIII crossed the walkway in 1921 for the inauguration of the dam Conde del Guadalhorce, and it became known by its present name.

The original path was constructed of concrete and rested on steel rails supported by stanchions built at approximately 45 degrees into the rock face. It deteriorated over the years, and there were numerous sections where part or all of the concrete top had collapsed. The result was large open-air gaps bridged only by narrow steel beams or other supports. Few of the original handrails remained, although a safety wire ran the length of the path. Several people died on the walkway and, after two fatal accidents in 1999 and 2000, the local government closed both entrances. Even so, in the four years leading up to 2013, four people died attempting to climb the gorge.

The regional government of Andalusia and the local government of Málaga agreed in June 2011 to share costs of restoration (including car parking and a museum) of €9 million. The project took approximately three years to complete. Many of the original features remained in place.

In March 2014, the cornerstone of the rehabilitation project was laid by specialized alpinists. The walkway reopened on 29 March 2015, and Lonely Planet listed it in the best new attractions for 2015. The new pathway offers a walk of 2.9 km along the side of the gorge.

In film
In the film Scent of Mystery released in 1960, also known as Holiday in Spain there is a chase scene towards the end of the film that takes place on the Caminito del Rey where the hero (Denholm Elliott) and his cohort (Peter Lorre) are chased by the antagonist (Paul Lucas). At the end of the chase Paul Lucas is run down by a train in a tunnel that is also part of the Park complex.

Some of the final scenes of the 1965 film Von Ryan's Express were shot at the confluence of the gateway and the railway.
In the film, they stand for the Italian-Swiss border.  Some of the area's deterioration is directly attributable to the crashing of planes into the cliffs during the filming.

The Horsemen (1971) was shot on location in Caminito del Rey.

An extended sequence in the 2012 Spanish thriller The End was filmed on the Caminito.

See also
Mount Hua

References

External links

 Caminito del Rey: hotel, history and environment
 Caminito del Rey: route description and GPS track in Wikiloc
 Official website of Caminito del Rey
 News on Caminito del Rey restoration
 Tourist Information for the El Chorro, Camino del Rey and Gudalhorce reservoirs in English
 Caminito del Rey travel information
 Historic and tourist information and multimedia content in English about El Caminito del Rey, 31/03/2015
 3D Virtual Tour, 20/03/2011
 "Chasm" Flash game at Archive.org

Landforms of Andalusia
Canyons and gorges of Spain
Via ferrata
Hiking trails in Spain
Tourist attractions in Andalusia
Geography of Andalusia